Your Face Sounds Familiar is a British talent show based on the Spanish series of the same name (a more formal translation would be "Your Face Looks Familiar" however the chosen title achieved a unique and relevant play on words). The show began on 29 June 2013 on ITV and ended on 3 August 2013. The show was co-presented by Alesha Dixon and Paddy McGuinness, whilst the judging panel consisted of Emma Bunton, Julian Clary, and a different guest judge in each episode. Guest judges included Cilla Black, Donny Osmond, Denise van Outen, Kian Egan, and Peter Andre.

The show involved six celebrities (actors, television personalities and sportsmen) portraying various iconic singers each week to win £10,000 for their chosen charity. The winner of the series was actress Natalie Anderson; she received the £50,000 grand prize for her charity.

On 3 August 2013, Anderson was announced as the series winner. She also won Week 2, 3 and 5 of the competition (as Britney Spears, Kate Bush, and Bonnie Tyler, respectively) collecting £10,000 for each of those weeks. In total, she won £80,000 for her chosen charity over the six weeks. The other weekly winners were Cheryl Fergison, who won the first week as Dusty Springfield and Matt Johnson, winner of the fourth week as Freddie Mercury. Both received £10,000 for their charities.

Format
The show challenged celebrities to perform as different iconic music artists every week, which were chosen by the show's "Randomiser". They were then judged by the panel of celebrity judges including Emma Bunton and Julian Clary. Each week, one celebrity guest judge joined Bunton and Clary to make up the complete judging panel. During the series, the celebrities were trained by vocal coach Yvie Burnett.
 
Each celebrity became transformed into a different singer each week, and performed an iconic song and dance routine well known by that particular singer. The 'randomiser' could choose any older or younger artist available in the machine, or even a singer of the opposite sex (except in week one), or a deceased singer, but it picked three out and the contestant then pressed the button to 'spin' the randomiser which selects their next singer.

Voting
The contestants were awarded points from the judges (and each other) based on their singing and dance routines. 15p from each viewer public vote was split equally between six chosen charities.

Judges award their points (up to 10 each, making a possible grand total of 30) to the contestants, while the contestants had to give 5 points to a fellow contestant of their choice (these are known as "Bonus" points) after all have performed. The total score of each contestant was then counted by summing the points from judges and contestant's voting with the points from the televoting.

Whoever was at the top of the leaderboard at the end of the each show, after the combination of the judges' and public votes, received a £10,000 cash prize for a charity of their choice and a further £50,000 grand prize for the "series champion" in the final week.

Episode list

Contestants
On 13 June 2013, the contestant line-up was revealed. The six celebrities that took part were Denise Lewis, Matt Johnson, Alexander Armstrong, Cheryl Fergison, Natalie Anderson and Bobby Davro.

Results summary

	
Color key:
 indicates the winning contestant that week
 indicates the runner-up contestants that week
 indicates the series champion
 indicates the two contestants eliminated
 indicates the contestant did not perform that week
 indicate the lowest-scoring contestant(s) that week
 indicate the highest-scoring contestant that week

Live show details

Group performance: "It's Only Rock 'n Roll (But I Like It)" by The Rolling Stones

Bonus points

The points were then given out as follows:
Denise gives her five points to Cheryl, taking her to 33
Natalie gives her five points to Denise, taking her to 28
Alexander gives his five points to Cheryl, taking her to 38
Bobby gives his five points to Denise, taking her to 33
Cheryl gives her points to Alexander, taking him to 26
Matt gives his five points to Natalie, taking her to 27

Week 2 (6 July)

Bonus points

The points were then given out as follows:
Matt gives his five points to Bobby, taking him to 34
Alexander gives his five points to Natalie, taking her to 30
Cheryl gives her points to Denise, taking her to 28
Denise gives her five points to Natalie, taking her to 35
Natalie gives her five points to Bobby, taking him to 39
Bobby gives his five points to Matt, taking him to 24

Week 3 (13 July)

Week 4 (20 July)

Week 5: Semi-final (27 July)

Week 6: Final (3 August)
In this episode, the eliminated celebrities (Bobby Davro and Denise Lewis) performed as Mary J Blige and George Michael in a special duet.

Judges

	
On 3 June 2013, singer and presenter Emma Bunton was announced as a judge on the show, of this she said "I love Saturday night television. Your Face Sounds Familiar is a great family show and what I love about the whole thing is the celebrities will have to deal with a great big production." She added "Being nasty is not fun - viewers are sick of people not being very nice to each other. It is about enjoying the acts. I am going to be fair. I know what it feels like to be in an audition and I want to pick up on the positive side."

On the same day, entertainer and comedian Julian Clary was announced as another judge on the show.

On each episode Bunton and Clary are joined by a guest judge who makes up the third judge on the panel. These have included Donny Osmond, Cilla Black, Peter Andre, Denise van Outen and Kian Egan.

Presenters
On 3 June 2013, it was announced that Alesha Dixon and Paddy McGuinness would present the six episodes in the first series. Of this, Dixon said, "This show is going to be a lot of fun. I can't wait to see their transformations and spectacular performances. I know that Paddy [McGuinness] and I are going to have our work cut out keeping them all in line!", whilst McGuinness said, "To be given a live show on Saturday night TV is a massive honour. Hairbrushes at the ready, for a proper good old Saturday night sing along. It's an honour to be in the same company as Ant & Dec, Dermot O'Leary and lest we not forget, Russ Abbot."

Several sources announced prior to the show, that if McGuinness had to leave at any time (due to his wife Christine being in labour with twins), Stephen Mulhern would take over as the co-presenter on the show. However, this didn't need to happen.

References

External links

2010s British reality television series
2013 British television series debuts
2013 British television series endings
2010s British music television series
British television series based on Spanish television series
English-language television shows
ITV (TV network) original programming
Television series by Banijay
UK
Television shows set in Hertfordshire
Television shows shot at Elstree Film Studios